Brassac is a commune in the Tarn department in southern France.

Geography

Gallery

See also
Communes of the Tarn department

References

External links
www.brassac.fr Official Web site
Panoramic virtual tour from Brassac bridge

Communes of Tarn (department)